WRBD may refer to:

 WRBD (AM), a radio station (1230 AM) licensed to serve Gainesville, Florida, United States
 WRBD-LP, a defunct low-power television station (channel 8) formerly licensed to serve Pensacola, Florida
 WWNN, a radio station (1470 AM) licensed to serve Pompano Beach, Florida, which held the call sign WRBD from 1963 to 1997